The following is a list of snakes of South Asia, primarily covering the region covered by mainland India, Pakistan, Nepal, Sri Lanka, Bangladesh, Bhutan, parts of Myanmar and the Andaman and Nicobar Island chains. All families are covered except for the Colubridae which is found here. This forms part of the complete list of reptiles of South Asia. South Asia and India in particular have the highest number of snake species in the world.

Order Squamata - suborder Serpents

Family Leptotyphlopidae 
 Myriopholis blanfordi
 Myriopholis hamulirostris

Family Typhlopidae

 Brahminy Blind Snake (Ramphotyphlops braminus) Bangladesh, Bhutan, India, Nepal, Pakistan, Sri Lanka
 Slender blind snake (Typhlops porrectus) Pakistan, India, Bangladesh, Sri Lanka
 Giant blind snake (Typhlops diardii) Northeast India, Bangladesh, China, Indo-China, Myanmar, Thailand, Malay region
 Pied blind snake (Typhlops leucomelas) Sri Lanka
 Jan's blind snake (Typhlops mirus) Sri Lanka
 Günther's blind snake (Typhlops pammeces Günther 1864)
 Typhlops exiguus
 Typhlops beddomii
 Typhlops andamanesis
 Rhinotyphlops acutus
 Ramphotyphlops exocoeti
 (Typhlops tindalli)
 (Typhlops thurstoni)
 (Typhlops tenuicollis)
 (Typhlops oligolepis)
 (Typhlops oatesii)
 (Typhlops meszoelyi)
 (Typhlops loveridgei)
 (Typhlops jerdoni)
 (Typhlops fletcheri)

Family Cylindrophiidae 
 Sri Lankan pipe snake Cylindrophis maculatus Sri Lanka

Family Uropeltidae 
 Palni Shieldtail Snake Teretrurus rhodogaster
 Two-lined Black Shieldtail Melanophidium bilineatum
 Beddome's Black Shieldtail Melanophidium punctatum
 Indian Black Earth Snake Melanophidium wynaudense
 Travancore Hills Thorntail Snake Platyplectrurus madurensis
 Lined Thorntail Snake Platyplectrurus trilineatus
 Kerala Shieldtail Plectrurus aureus
 Günther's Burrowing Snake Plectrurus guentheri
 Nilgiri Burrowing Snake Plectrurus perroteti
 Karnataka burrowing snake Pseudoplectrurus canaricus
 Cardamom Hills Earth Snake Rhinophis fergusonianus
 Schneider's Earth Snake Rhinophis oxyrhynchus
 Salty Earth Snake Rhinophis sanguineus
 Travancore Shieldtail Rhinophis travancoricus
 Purple-red Earth Snake Teretrurus sanguineus
 Madurai Earth Snake Uropeltis arcticeps
 Beddome's Earth Snake Uropeltis beddomii
 Bhupathy's shieldtail Uropeltis bhupathyi
 Brougham's Earth Snake Uropeltis broughami
 Ceylon Earth Snake Uropeltis ceylanicus
 Sirumalai Hills Earth Snake Uropeltis dindigalensis
 Elliot's Earth Snake Uropeltis ellioti
 Smith's Earth Snake Uropeltis grandis
 Jerdon's shieldtail Uropeltis jerdoni
 Günther's Earth Snake Uropeltis liura
 Bombay Earth Snake Uropeltis macrolepis
 Anaimalai Earth Snake Uropeltis macrorhynchus
 Spotted Earth Snake Uropeltis maculatus
 Boulenger's Earth Snake Uropeltis myhendrae
 Southern Earth Snake Uropeltis nitidus
 Ocellated Shieldtail Uropeltis ocellatus
 Shieldtail Earth Snake Uropeltis petersi
 Phipson's Shieldtail Uropeltis phipsonii
 Indian Earth Snake Uropeltis pulneyensis
 Red-lined Earth Snake Uropeltis rubrolineatus
 Red-spotted Earth Snake Uropeltis rubromaculatus
 Woodmason's Earth Snake Uropeltis woodmasoni

Family Acrochordidae 

 Wart snake Acrochordus granulatus India, Sri Lanka, Philippines, Timor

Family Boidae
 Common sand boa Eryx conicus Pakistan, India, Bangladesh, Sri Lanka 
 Red sand boa Eryx johnii India, Pakistan
 Whitaker's sand boa Eryx whitakeri Southwest India
 Burmese python, India and Myanmar
 Indian rock python Python molurus Pakistan, India, Nepal, Bhutan, Bangladesh, Sri Lanka, Myanmar, Thailand, China, Hong Kong, Taiwan, Java 
 Reticulated python Python reticulatus India (Arunachal Pradesh, Nicobars), Myanmar, China, Indo-China, Malay region
 Burmese python Python bivittatus India, Nepal, Bhutan

Family Xenopeltidae 
 Sunbeam snake Xenopeltis unicolor India (Nicobars), Myanmar, Thailand, China, Indo-China, Malay region

Family Elapidae 

 Andamans krait Bungarus andamanensis India (Andamans)
 Common Indian krait Bungarus caeruleus Pakistan, India, Nepal, Bangladesh, Sri Lanka
 Sri Lankan krait Bungarus ceylonicus Sri Lanka
 Banded krait Bungarus fasciatus Bangladesh, India, Nepal, Myanmar, Thailand, Indo-China, China, Malay region
 Sindh krait Bungarus sindanus Pakistan, India
 Northeastern Hill Krait Bungarus bungaroides Lesser Black Krait Bungarus lividus Greater Black Krait Bungarus niger Beddome's Coral Snake Calliophis beddomei MacClelland's coral snake Calliophis macclellandi Nepal, India, Myanmar, Indo-China, Taiwan
 Slender coral snake Calliophis melanurus Bangladesh, India, Sri Lanka
 Black Coral Snake Calliophis nigrescens Bibron's Coral Snake Calliophis bibroni Monocled cobra Naja kaouthia Bangladesh, India, Myanmar, Thailand, Indo-China, China
 Spectacled cobra Naja naja Pakistan, India, Nepal, Bangladesh, Sri Lanka
 Black cobra Naja oxiana Central Asia, Pakistan, India
 Andaman cobra Naja sagittifera India (Andamans)
 King cobra Ophiophagus hannah India, Nepal, Pakistan, Bangladesh, Myanmar, Thailand, China, Indo-China, Malay region, Philippines

Family Hydrophiidae
 Spine-tailed seasnake Aipysurus eydouxii (Gray, 1849)
 Large-headed sea snake Astrotia stokesii (Gray, 1846) Pakistan, Sri Lanka, Malay region
 Olive-headed seasnake Disteira major (Shaw, 1802)
 Disteira nigrocincta (Daudin, 1803)
 Wall's sea snake Disteira walli Kharin, 1989
 Beaked seasnake or hook-nosed sea snake Enhydrina schistosa (Daudin, 1803) Persian Gulf, Pakistan, India, Sri Lanka, Bangladesh, Indo-China, Malay peninsula
 Faint-banded seasnake Hydrophis belcheri (Gray, 1849)
 Peters' sea snake Hydrophis bituberculatus Peters, 1872
 Hydrophis brooki Günther, 1872
 Blue sea snake Hydrophis caerulescens Shaw, 1802 Pakistan, India, Bangladesh, China, Malay region
 Annulated sea snake Hydrophis cyanocinctus Daudin, 1803
 Banded sea snake Hydrophis fasciatus (Schneider, 1799) Pakistan, India, Myanmar, Malay region
 Hydrophis inornatus (Gray, 1849)
 Kloss' sea snake Hydrophis klossi Boulenger, 1912
 Bombay sea snake Hydrophis mamillaris Pakistan, India, Sri Lanka
 Black-banded sea snake Hydrophis nigrocinctus India, Bangladesh, Sri Lanka, Myanmar
 Estuarine sea snake Hydrophis obscurus India, Bangladesh, Sri Lanka, Myanmar
 Cochin banded sea snake Hydrophis ornatus Persian Gulf, Pakistan, India, Bangladesh, Sri Lanka, Malay region, Indo-China, China
 Persian Gulf sea snake Hydrophis lapemoides (Gray, 1849)
 Slender-necked seasnake Hydrophis melanocephalus (Gray, 1849)
 Yellow sea snake Hydrophis spiralis (Shaw, 1802)
 Collared sea snake Hydrophis stricticollis Günther, 1864
 Jerdon's sea snake Kerilia jerdonii India, Sri Lanka, Malay peninsula
 Bighead sea snake Kolpophis annandalei (Laidlaw, 1901)
 Short sea snake Lapemis curtus (Shaw, 1802) Pakistan, India, Sri Lanka, Malay region, Indo-China
 Yellow-lipped sea krait Laticauda colubrina India, East of the islands of the Sundas
 Laticauda laticaudata ( Linnaeus, 1758)
 Hardwicke's spine-bellied seasnake Lapemis hardwickii Gray, 1834
 Annulated sea snake Hydrophis cyanocinctus Persian Gulf, Pakistan, India, Sri Lanka, Bangladesh, Malay region
 Yellow sea snake Hydrophis spiralis Persian Gulf, Pakistan, India, Sri Lanka, Malay region
 Microcephalophis cantoris Slender narrow-headed sea snake Microcephalophis gracilis Pakistan, India, Sri Lanka, Bangladesh, Malay region, China
 Yellow-bellied sea snake Pelamis platurus Thalassophina viperina  Anomalous sea snake Thalassophis anomalusFamily Viperidae 

 Himalayan pit viper Gloydius himalayanus India, Pakistan, Nepal 
 Levantine viper Macrovipera lebetinus Middle East, Pakistan
 Russel's viper Daboia russelii Pakistan, India, Bangladesh, Sri Lanka, Myanmar, Thailand, China, Indo-China, islands of Java, Komodo, Flores, Indonesia
 Indian saw-scaled viper Echis carinatus Pakistan, India, Nepal, Bangladesh, Sri Lanka
 Echis megalocephalus Common hump-nosed pit viper Hypnale hypnale India, Sri Lanka
 Millard's hump-nosed pit viper Hypnale nepa Sri Lanka
 Wall's hump-nosed pit viper Hypnale walli Sri Lanka
 Blotched pit viper Ovophis monticola Bangladesh, India, Nepal
 Brown spotted pit viper Protobothrops mucrosquamatus India, Bangladesh, China, Myanmar, Vietnam 
 Protobothrops jerdonii White-lipped pit viper Trimeresurus albolabris India, Nepal, Bangladesh, China, Myanmar, Thailand, Sumatra, Java, Lesser Sundas up to Timor
 Anderson's pit viper Trimeresurus andersonii India (Andamans)
 Bamboo pit viper Trimeresurus gramineus Nepal, India
 Large-scaled green pit viper Trimeresurus macrolepis Southwest India
 Malabar rock pit viper Trimeresurus malabaricus Southwest India
 Tibetan pit viper Trimeresurus tibetanus Tibet, Nepal
 Trimeresurus stejnegeri Trimeresurus purpureomaculatus Pope's Pit Viper Trimeresurus popeiorum Medo Pit Viper Trimeresurus medoensis Trimeresurus labialis Trimeresurus erythrurus Cantor's Pit Viper Trimeresurus cantori Pseudocerastes persicusFamily Columbridae
 Elachistodon westermanni''

See also
 Wildlife of India
 List of reptiles of South Asia

References

 Romulus Whitaker & Ashok Captain, (2004) Snakes of India: The Field Guide. Draco Books, Chennai.
 Daniel, J.C.(2002) The Book of Indian Reptiles and Amphibians. Bombay Natural History Society and Oxford University Press.

External links
 List of snakes in the Indian museum (1891)
 The poisonous snakes of India (1908)
 Reptile database
 Indian snake checklist
 Herpetology in South Asia
 ReptileIndia Yahoo Group

South Asia
South Asia
Snakes
Environment of Pakistan